The Florisbad archaeological and paleontological site is a provincial heritage site in Brandfort in the Free State province of South Africa. The most notable find at this site is the Florisbad Skull, the partial skull of an early human species that was discovered in 1932.

In 1997 it was described in the Government Gazette as

References

 South African Heritage Resource Agency database

Archaeological sites in South Africa
Paleoanthropological sites
Archaeological sites of Southern Africa